Public Domain Day (PDD) is an observance of when copyrights expire and works enter into the public domain. This legal transition of copyright works into the public domain usually happens every year on January 1 based on the individual copyright laws of each country.

The observance of a "Public Domain Day" was initially informal; the earliest known mention was in 2004 by Wallace McLean (a Canadian public domain activist), with support for the idea echoed by Lawrence Lessig. Several websites list the authors whose works are entering the public domain each January 1. There are activities in countries around the world by various organizations all under the banner Public Domain Day.

Public domain

Copyright protection terms are typically described as expiring a number of years after the end of the calendar year when the author died ( or pma). Durations vary by country; in many jurisdictions, including the US and European Union, copyright usually lasts 70 years . In such countries, the works of authors who died in  will pass into the public domain on January 1, . These works become fully available so that anyone can access and use them for any purpose, without authorization.

Since public domain rights vary based on jurisdiction, the passage of a work into the public domain is not worldwide. In the United States, no additional published works entered the public domain automatically from 1999 to 2018. Australia copyright scheme is even more restrictive, with no additional public domain entrances until 2026. Each year, most European countries see various works passing into the public domain, as do Canada and New Zealand. 

Public Domain Day in 2010 celebrated the entry to the public domain in many countries of the works of authors such as Sigmund Freud, William Butler Yeats, Ford Madox Ford and Arthur Rackham. In 2011, it celebrated the public domain status of Isaac Babel, Walter Benjamin, John Buchan, Mikhail Bulgakov, F. Scott Fitzgerald, Emma Goldman, Paul Klee, Selma Lagerlöf, Leon Trotsky, Vito Volterra, Nathanael West, and others.

Significant materials entering the public domain in 2021 included: F. Scott Fitzgerald's The Great Gatsby, Virginia Woolf's Mrs. Dalloway, Ernest Hemingway's In Our Time, Franz Kafka's The Trial, and the jazz standard "Sweet Georgia Brown".

Celebrations

There is no explicit time when Public Domain Day began being observed (it was mentioned by Lawrence Lessig in 2004), but in recent years it has been mentioned by Project Gutenberg and has been promoted by Creative Commons. Public Domain Day events have been hosted on various dates in Poland, Germany, Switzerland, Italy and Israel.

In January 2011, to celebrate Public Domain Day 2011, Open Knowledge Foundation launched The Public Domain Review, a web-based review of works which have entered the public domain.

In January 2012, a celebration was announced in Warsaw, Poland and for the first time in Kraków), where for several years on that day various activities have been organized by free culture NGOs (such as Koalicja Otwartej Edukacji and Open Society Institute) and other supporters. Other 2012 events announced worldwide:
 Switzerland: Public Domain Jam, Zurich
 Israel: PD Day Celebration at Haifa University, Haifa
 North Macedonia: Events and promotional activities on the Public Domain
 Italy: 
 La giornata del Pubblico Dominio, Turin
 Festeggiamo il Giorno del Pubblico Dominio, Rome
 Celebriamo il Giorno del Pubblico Dominio e la Cultura Libera, Grosseto
 France: Journée du domaine public, Paris

In later years, Public Domain Day events have been organized by Communia, which also maintained the (now defunct) publicdomainday.org website.

2019 

Public Domain Day in 2019 was significant in the United States as it was the first to have any meaningful copyright expirations there since the event's establishment: a 20-year freeze had been imposed in 1998 with the passage of the Sonny Bono Copyright Term Extension Act. Several activities were carried to celebrate the event, including a special section at the MIT Libraries for public domain works and the "Grand Re-Opening of the Public Domain" that took place at the Internet Archive with the presence of members of Creative Commons, the Electronic Frontier Foundation and the Wikimedia Foundation, among other scholars like Pam Samuelson, Lawrence Lessig and James Boyle.

2022 

In 2022 in the United States, in addition to works published in 1926 that had had their copyright renewed, about 400,000 sound recordings from before 1923 also passed into the public domain under the CLASSICS Act.

See also
 2023 in public domain
 2024 in public domain
 Culture Freedom Day
 Document Freedom Day
 Software Freedom Day
 Hardware Freedom Day
 Public domain in the United States

References

External links

 Public Domain Day 2023 at the Center for the Study of the Public Domain, Duke University School of Law 
 Public Domain Manifesto
 Public Domain Review
 Public Domain Day International (last updated in 2020)

Public domain
Unofficial observances
Intellectual property activism
January observances
Recurring events established in 2004
Articles containing video clips